Annandale is a village in the Pomeroon-Supenaam Region of Guyana, located on the Atlantic coast, a few kilometres northerly of the mouth of the Essequibo River. It was formerly a sugar plantation.

References

Populated places in Pomeroon-Supenaam